John Shoemaker (born August 18, 1956) is a former minor league baseball player who is currently manager of the Rancho Cucamonga Quakes.

Shoemaker attended Waverly High School and the University of Miami before he was drafted in the 35th round of the 1977 MLB Draft by the Los Angeles Dodgers. Shoemaker was also drafted in the 6th round by the Chicago Bulls in the 1978 NBA draft. He played in the Dodgers minor league system, primarily as a second baseman, from 1977-1980, making it all the way up to AAA before retiring to become a coach after the 1981 season. Has been part of the Dodgers organization since 1977. The Dodgers named him "Captain of Player Development" in 2015 as recognition of his "continual demonstration of superior teammate behavior" according to the Dodgers head of player development, Gabe Kapler. At the end of the 2015 season, he was awarded with the Mike Coolbaugh Award presented by Minor League Baseball to the person "who has shown outstanding baseball work ethic, knowledge of the game and skill in mentoring young players on the field." He was also named to the Southern League Hall of Fame in 2016.

Coaching/Managing career

1981–1986: Batting Coach for the Vero Beach Dodgers
1987–1988: Manager of the Vero Beach Dodgers
1989–1991: Manager of the San Antonio Missions - Lost in championship game in 1990
1992: Manager of the Gulf Coast Dodgers
1993: Manager of the Yakima Bears
1995: Manager of the Great Falls Dodgers
1996: Manager of the Savannah Sand Gnats - Won South Atlantic League Championship - AMF
1997–1998: Manager of the Vero Beach Dodgers
2000: Manager of the Vero Beach Dodgers
2001: Manager of the Jacksonville Suns - Won League Championship & Southern League Manager of the Year Award
2002: Minor League Defensive Instructor for the Los Angeles Dodgers
2003: Manager of the Las Vegas 51s
2004: Assistant Field Coordinator for the Los Angeles Dodgers
2005–2008: Manager of the Jacksonville Suns - Won League Championship in 2005
2009–2010: coordinator of the Los Angeles Dodgers training complex in Glendale, Arizona
2011–2012: Manager of the Great Lakes Loons
2013: coordinator of Arizona Instruction - Los Angeles Dodgers
2014: Manager of the Arizona League Dodgers
2015: Manager of the Ogden Raptors
2016–2017: Manager of the Arizona League Dodgers
2018–2020: Manager of the Great Lakes Loons
2021–present: Manager of the Rancho Cucamonga Quakes

References

External links

Living people
1956 births
University of Miami alumni
Miami Hurricanes men's basketball players
Chicago Bulls draft picks
Clinton Dodgers players
Lodi Dodgers players
San Antonio Dodgers players
San Antonio Missions managers
Albuquerque Dukes players
Las Vegas 51s managers
People from Chillicothe, Ohio
American expatriate baseball people in the Dominican Republic